Brian Joseph Burton (born July 29, 1977), known professionally as Danger Mouse, is an American musician, songwriter, and record producer. He came to prominence in 2004 when he released The Grey Album, which combined vocal performances from Jay-Z's The Black Album with instrumentals from the Beatles' The Beatles, also known as The White Album. In 2008, Esquire named him one of the "75 most influential people of the 21st century".

He formed Gnarls Barkley with CeeLo Green and produced its albums St. Elsewhere and The Odd Couple. In 2009, he collaborated with James Mercer of the indie rock band The Shins to form the band Broken Bells; the band released three albums since then, with Into the Blue (2022) being the most recent one. In addition, Burton worked with rapper MF Doom as Danger Doom and released the album The Mouse and the Mask.

As a producer Danger Mouse produced the second Gorillaz album, 2005's Demon Days, as well as Beck's 2008 record Modern Guilt and four albums with The Black Keys (Attack & Release, Brothers, El Camino and Turn Blue). In 2016, Danger Mouse produced, performed on and co-wrote songs for the eleventh studio album by the Red Hot Chili Peppers titled The Getaway. Danger Mouse has also produced and co-written albums by Norah Jones (Little Broken Hearts), Electric Guest (Mondo), Portugal. The Man (Evil Friends), Adele (25), and ASAP Rocky (At.Long.Last.ASAP). He has been nominated for 22 Grammy Awards and has won six. Danger Mouse has been nominated in the Producer of the Year category five times, and won the award in 2011.

Early life and music career beginnings
Brian Joseph Burton was born in White Plains, New York. He spent much of his childhood in Spring Valley, New York. Burton moved to Stone Mountain, Georgia, a suburb of Atlanta, where he attended and graduated from Redan High School. He lived in Athens, Georgia, where he pursued a degree in telecommunications at the University of Georgia on scholarship, and where his trip hop works (The Chilling Effect (1999), Rhode Island (2000), and Pelican City / Scanner - Pelican City vs. Scanner (2002)) were released while he was a student. While at the University of Georgia he was introduced to Nirvana, Pink Floyd, and Portishead, and came to know the indie rock scene in Athens, remixed work by several local artists, including Neutral Milk Hotel, and DJ'd for University of Georgia radio station WUOG-FM. From 1998 to 2003, Burton created a series of remix CDs and records under the stage name Danger Mouse. He performed in a mouse outfit because he was too shy to show his face, and took his name from the English cartoon series Danger Mouse.

Music career 
While in Athens, Burton took second place in a 1998 talent contest and was asked to open for a concert at the University of Georgia featuring OutKast and Goodie Mob. Afterwards, Burton claims he approached CeeLo Green, a member of Goodie Mob, and gave him an instrumental demo tape. CeeLo has no recollection of this and the instrumental demo tape's existence has never been confirmed. Trey Reames who had promoted CeeLo's first solo shows in Georgia, moved to London and became Burton's first manager. He suggested and negotiated CeeLo's appearance on the 26' Remix of the Danger Mouse and Jemini record. When Burton met CeeLo for this project, he shared some beats which led them to collaborate as Gnarls Barkley.

2001–2004 
Burton moved to Britain for a couple of years, living in New Cross in London and working at the Rose pub  near London Bridge. While there, he sent a demo to Lex Records, which signed him. Burton relocated to Los Angeles; his first original releases under the name Danger Mouse were his collaborations with rapper Jemini, including the album Ghetto Pop Life, released in 2003 on Lex Records. The Danger Mouse debut was well received by critics, but he did not rise to fame until he created The Grey Album, mixing a cappella versions of Jay-Z's The Black Album over beats crafted from samples of the Beatles' eponymous album, also known as The White Album. The remix album, originally created just for his friends, spread over the Internet and became very popular with both the general audience and critics, with Rolling Stone calling it the ultimate remix record and Entertainment Weekly ranking it the best record of that year. He discussed his feelings about any controversy the album may have created in the documentary Alternative Freedom. Danger Mouse was named among the Men of the Year by GQ in 2004 and won a 2005 Wired Rave Award.

2004–2007 
The Grey Album got the attention of Damon Albarn, who enlisted Danger Mouse to produce Gorillaz' second studio album, Demon Days. Demon Days earned Burton a Grammy Award nomination for Producer of the Year.

Danger Mouse's next project was The Mouse and the Mask, a collaboration with MF Doom (as Danger Doom) about and for Cartoon Network's Adult Swim. The two had previously collaborated on the Danger Mouse remix of Zero 7's "Somersault", on the Prince Po track "Social Distortion", and on Gorillaz' "November Has Come". A year later, Danger Doom released a follow-up EP called Occult Hymn. The 7-track EP featured new songs as well as remixes of tracks from The Mouse & The Mask and was released as a free download on Adult Swim's site.

In 2006, Danger Mouse and CeeLo as Gnarls Barkley released their first album, St. Elsewhere, which included the international hit single "Crazy". "Crazy" became the first UK number-one single based solely on downloads. Gnarls Barkley set out on tour and was one of the main opening acts on the Red Hot Chili Peppers' Stadium Arcadium World Tour. The Gnarls Barkley touring lineup featured future Chili Peppers guitarist, Josh Klinghoffer. He produced two tracks on The Rapture's 2006 album Pieces of the People We Love. In the autumn of 2006, Sparklehorse released his fourth album, Dreamt for Light Years in the Belly of a Mountain, a collaboration with Danger Mouse and Steven Drozd of The Flaming Lips. In August and September 2006, Danger Mouse collaborated with British graffiti artist Banksy to replace 500 copies of Paris Hilton's album Paris in British music stores with altered album artwork and a 40-minute instrumental song containing various statements she had made.

2007–present 

In January 2007, Danger Mouse produced another collaboration with Damon Albarn on The Good, the Bad & the Queen, along with The Clash bassist Paul Simonon, former The Verve guitarist Simon Tong and afrobeat pioneer and Africa 70 drummer Tony Allen.

In March 2008, The Odd Couple, the second album of his and CeeLo Green's Gnarls Barkley project, was released. In May 2008, an album with Martina Topley-Bird, titled The Blue God, was released. Martina collaborated on "All Alone", one song on the Danger Mouse produced Gorillaz second LP, Demon Days. Also released in May 2008 was Replica Sun Machine, an album with the band The Shortwave Set, including a collaboration with Van Dyke Parks and the Velvet Underground's John Cale, according to British music magazine New Musical Express.

Upcoming releases include a follow-up to Ghetto Pop Life entitled Kill Your Heroes. It was scheduled to be released in summer of 2006, but its release was pushed back to an undetermined date. A collaborative album with Black Thought of The Roots is said to be in the works. He was also working on an album with The Black Keys and Ike Turner. Turner's death was expected to cancel the album, but The Black Keys and Danger Mouse released Attack & Release in April 2008. Some songs must have been recorded by Turner, however, as a posthumous Danger Mouse produced album has been mentioned, as well as another collaboration with MF Doom.

Danger Mouse produced and crafted beat structures with Beck for Beck's album Modern Guilt, which was released in July 2008. In April 2009, he and Helena Costas released an album as Joker's Daughter titled The Last Laugh. Danger Mouse was also listed as one of Esquires 75 most influential people of the 21st century.

Since 2005, Danger Mouse (as a producer as well as an artist with Gnarls Barkley) has been nominated for 12 Grammy Awards: Producer of the Year (2005, 2006 and 2008), Record of Year (2006), Album of Year (2006), Best Alternative Album (2006 and 2008), Best Urban Alternative Performance (2006), Best Short Form Music Video (2007 and 2008) and Best Pop Performance (2008). He won two Grammy Awards in 2006 for Best Alternative Album and Best Urban Alternative Performance. He won in 2017 for his work as a producer on Adele's 25.

Danger Mouse and Sparklehorse were due to release an album in the summer of 2009 entitled Danger Mouse and Sparklehorse Present: Dark Night of the Soul (together with a 100+ photo book with photographs by David Lynch). Due to a dispute with EMI the album was not released officially until July 12, 2010. However, the BBC reported that Danger Mouse planned to release a full illustrated jewel case with a blank CD-R included in it. The CD-R was to be labeled: "For Legal Reasons, enclosed CD-R contains no music. Use it as you will."

On November 8, 2009, Paste magazine named Danger Mouse the "Best Producer of the Decade (2000–2009)."

Together with James Mercer, Danger Mouse (billed by his real name, Brian Burton) formed Broken Bells. The project was first announced on September 29, 2009. On December 21, 2009, the band informed fans in an e-mail message of the release of their debut single "The High Road", which was made available as a free download on their official site. The self-titled debut album was released in the U.S. on March 9, 2010.

In 2010, Danger Mouse began producing U2's thirteenth studio album Songs of Innocence, released in 2014. U2's frontman, Bono, said in 2010, "We have about 12 songs with him. At the moment that looks like the album we will put out next because it's just happening so easily." Ultimately, Danger Mouse was credited as co-producer on 7 of the album's 11 tracks, and sole producer on "Sleep Like a Baby Tonight" and "This Is Where You Can Reach Me Now". During this period, he also produced the band's single "Ordinary Love", released in 2013 as part of the soundtrack to Mandela: Long Walk to Freedom, as well as their single "Invisible", which was released on Super Bowl Sunday, February 2, 2014.

In 2005, Danger Mouse began composing a "Spaghetti Western" album with composer Daniele Luppi as well as Jack White and Norah Jones performing the main vocals on the album. Instrumentation was done mainly by musicians who played on the original Ennio Morricone scores. Danger Mouse does not play any instruments on the album. The style of the album reflects much of Danger Mouse's work since 2005, such as segments of Beck's Modern Guilt, aspects of Dark Night of the Soul, and songs like "Mongrel Heart" off of the self-titled Broken Bells album. The album was titled Rome and was released on May 16, 2011.

On February 13, 2011, Danger Mouse won a Grammy for Best Producer for his work on the Black Keys' Brothers, Broken Bells' self-titled album, and the Danger Mouse and Sparklehorse album Dark Night of the Soul.

On November 1, 2011, Los Angeles-based indie band Electric Guest released their first single, "Troubleman/American Daydream", produced by Danger Mouse. Danger Mouse produced the band's whole debut album Mondo which was released on April 24, 2012.

On May 1, 2012, Norah Jones released her Danger Mouse-produced fifth studio album Little Broken Hearts (Blue Note/EMI).

Danger Mouse co-wrote the song "Keep It for Your Own" by POP ETC.

Danger Mouse produced Portugal. The Man's seventh studio album, Evil Friends, released in June 2013.

Danger Mouse produced At.Long.Last.ASAP, the 2015 album by rapper ASAP Rocky.

In November 2015 Danger Mouse launched his own record label, 30th Century Records.

Danger Mouse was announced as the producer for the Red Hot Chili Peppers eleventh album and that he would replace Rick Rubin, the producer of the band's previous six albums dating back to 1991. Production began in February 2015. The production was halted due to an injury the band's bassist Flea suffered during a skiing trip. It resumed in August 2015 and continued into early 2016. The Getaway was released in June 2016 with Danger Mouse performing on and having co-writing credits on many of the songs.

In March 2017, Red Hot Chili Peppers singer Anthony Kiedis indicated that the band would likely want to work again with Danger Mouse on the follow-up to The Getaway. Kiedis stated "I think it's good to work with the same guy again to um, you know you had your freshman experience. I think we owe it to ourselves to start from the beginning with this guy and see what we can accomplish."

In April 2017, he released Resistance Radio: The Man in The High Castle, a compilation produced alongside 30th Century Records-signee producer Sam Cohen. Connected to Amazon's eponymous TV series, this album contains covers of 1960s classics by contemporary artists like Beck, Norah Jones, Kelis, Andrew VanWyngarden, The Shins, and more.

In June 2017, Portugal. The Man released Woodstock, their follow-up to 2013's Evil Friends; both of which featured production from Danger Mouse.

In June 2017, he collaborated with Run the Jewels and Big Boi to create the song "Chase Me" for the 2017 film Baby Driver.

In May 2018, he produced the acclaimed album Wide Awake! by Parquet Courts.

In March 2019, he collaborated with Karen O to create the album Lux Prima. The album has been met with generally favorable review by critics.

In October 2022, he released a third Broken Bells album with James Mercer entitled Into The Blue (stylized all caps).

Philosophy 
In an interview for The New York Times magazine, Danger Mouse was compared to a film auteur, basing his music production philosophy on the cinematic philosophy of directors like Woody Allen. "Woody Allen was an auteur: he did his thing, and that particular thing was completely his own", he said. "That's what I decided to do with music. I want to create a director's role within music, which is what I tried to do on this album (St. Elsewhere)... I can create different kinds of musical worlds, but the artist needs the desire to go into that world... Musically, there is no one who has the career I want. That's why I have to use film directors as a model."

Awards

Grammy Awards

|-
| style="text-align:center;" rowspan="2"|  2006
|style="text-align:left;" | Danger Mouse
| Producer of the Year, Non-Classical
| 
|-
|style="text-align:left;" | "Feel Good Inc."
|rowspan="2"| Record of the Year
| 
|-
| style="text-align:center;" rowspan="5"| 2007
|style="text-align:left;" rowspan="2"| "Crazy"
| 
|-
| Best Urban/Alternative Performance || 
|-
|style="text-align:left;" rowspan="2"| St. Elsewhere || Album of the Year || 
|-
| Best Alternative Music Album || 
|-
| Danger Mouse || Producer of the Year, Non-Classical || 
|-
|style="text-align:center;" | 2008
| "Gone Daddy Gone"
| rowspan="2"|Best Short Form Music Video
| 
|-
|style="text-align:center;" rowspan="4"| 2009
| "Who's Gonna Save My Soul"
| 
|-
| "Going On"
| Best Pop Performance by a Duo or Group with Vocals
| 
|-
| The Odd Couple || Best Alternative Music Album || 
|-
| Danger Mouse || Producer of the Year, Non-Classical || 
|-
|style="text-align:center;" rowspan="2"| 2011 || Broken Bells || Best Alternative Music Album || 
|-
| Danger Mouse || rowspan="2"| Producer of the Year, Non-Classical || 
|-
|style="text-align:center;" | 2012 || Danger Mouse || 
|-
|style="text-align:center;" rowspan="4"| 2013 ||style="text-align:left;" rowspan="2"| El Camino || Album of the Year || 
|-
| Best Rock Album || 
|-
|rowspan="2"| "Lonely Boy" || Record of the Year || 
|-
|rowspan="2"| Best Rock Song || 
|-
| style="text-align:center;" |2015 ||| "Fever" || 
|-
| style="text-align:center;" |2017 ||| 25 || Album of the Year || 
|-
| style="text-align:center;" |2018 ||| "Chase Me" || Best Rap Song || 
|-
| style="text-align:center;" |2020 ||| "Woman" || Best Rock Performance || 
|-
| style="text-align:center;" |2021 ||| Kiwanuka || Best Rock Album || 
|}

Other awards
2004 Entertainment Weeklys Album of the Year (Danger Mouse – The Grey Album)
2004 GQ Magazine'''s "Men of the Year"
2005 Wired Magazines Rave Award (Music)
2005 Q – Best Producer
2006 Entertainment Weekly's Album of the Year (Gnarls Barkley – St. Elsewhere)
2006 Q (Song of the Year – Gnarls Barkley's "Crazy")
2008 Rolling Stone – Best Producer in Rock
2009 Esquire – 75 Most Influential People of the 21st Century
2009 GQ Magazine's Album of the Year (Danger Mouse & Sparklehorse – Dark Night of the Soul)
2009 Paste – Producer of the Decade
2010 Rolling Stone'' – Song of the Decade (Gnarls Barkley – "Crazy")
2013 Music Producers Guild – International Producer of the Year
2014 71st Golden Globe Awards (winner) (Best Original Song – "Ordinary Love")
2016 74th Golden Globe Awards (nominee) (Best Original Song – "Gold")

Discography

References

External links 

 
 EFF: Grey Tuesday: A Quick Overview of the Legal Terrain
 Cease and desist letter from EMI #1

1977 births
Living people
African-American male songwriters
African-American record producers
American expatriates in England
Copyright activists
Gnarls Barkley members
American hip hop DJs
Capitol Records artists
American hip hop record producers
Singers from New York (state)
Grammy Award winners
People from White Plains, New York
American neo soul singers
Alternative hip hop musicians
American indie rock musicians
East Coast hip hop musicians
Songwriters from New York (state)
Golden Globe Award-winning musicians
People from Spring Valley, New York
Broken Bells members
Record producers from New York (state)
Lex Records artists
Parlophone artists
21st-century African-American male singers